The 2004 Algarve Cup was the 11th edition of the Algarve Cup, an invitational women's football tournament held annually in Portugal. It took place 14–20 March 2004. The USA won the tournament defeating Norway, 4-1, in the final game.

Format
The twelve invited teams are split into three groups that played a round-robin tournament.

Since the expansion to 12 teams in 2002, the Algarve Cup format has been as follows: Groups A and B, containing the strongest ranked teams, are the only ones in contention to win the title. The group A and B winners contest the final – to win the Algarve Cup. The runners-up play for third place, and those that finish third in the groups play for fifth place.  The teams in Group C played for places 7–12. The winner of Group C played the team that finished fourth in Group A or B (whichever has the better record) for seventh place. The Group C runner-up played the team who finishes last in Group A or B (with the worse record) for ninth place. The third and fourth-placed teams in Group C played for the eleventh place.

Points awarded in the group stage followed the standard formula of three points for a win, one point for a draw and zero points for a loss. In the case of two teams being tied on the same number of points in a group, their head-to-head result determined the higher place.

Teams

Group stage

Group A

Group B

Group C

Placement play-offs

Eleventh place match

Ninth place match

Seventh place match

Fifth place match

Third place match

Final

Final standings

References

External links
Algarve Cup on WomensSoccerUnited.com
RSSSF.com history page, with links to full results
Full results and history
Footballzz.co.uk: Algarve Women's Football Cup 2004
Results and Standings at Portuguese Football Federation (FPF)

2004
Algarve Cup
Alg
March 2004 sports events in Europe
2004 in Portuguese women's sport